Shahnaz Ansari (10 January 1970 – 15 February 2020) was a Pakistani politician who was a Member of the Provincial Assembly of Sindh from June 2013 until her death.
Salma khokhar killed shahnaz Ansari at her village.

Early life and education
She was born on 10 January 1970 in Naushahro Feroze. She earned the degree of Bachelor of Arts from the Shah Abdul Latif University.

Political career

She was elected to the Provincial Assembly of Sindh as a candidate of the Pakistan Peoples Party (PPP) on a reserved seat for women in the 2013 Pakistani general election, and re-elected in the 2018 general election.

Death 
On 15 February 2020, while Ansari was in Dil Murad Khokhar village, Naushehro Feroze District, she was attacked and received six bullets to the chest. She was taken to the Peoples Medical College Hospital but died due to her injuries while on the way.

References

2020 deaths
Sindh MPAs 2013–2018
Women members of the Provincial Assembly of Sindh
1970 births
Pakistan People's Party MPAs (Sindh)
Shah Abdul Latif University alumni
Deaths by firearm in Sindh
Assassinated Pakistani politicians
21st-century Pakistani women politicians